Monarch School was a year round, co-ed located in Heron, Montana. It closed abruptly in September 2017, with its owners citing unsustainable student enrollment as the primary reason. Many allegations of sexual, emotional, verbal and physical abuse including long "group therapy" sessions resembling the therapeutically disproven "games" of the Synanon cult has been levelled at the school by parents and ex-students.

History 
Monarch School, INC was incorporated in Idaho by founder Patrick McKenna in September 2000. According to The Mission Statement, "The Monarch School exists to provide young adults with the foundation of knowledge and self-awareness to achieve their dreams as healthy human beings".

As the school did not have an official campus when it opened, McKenna ran the school out of his North Idaho home. In late 2001, students moved from the Mckenna residence onto the Monarch campus in Heron, Montana. The campus comprised several small dormitories in separate houses, classroom buildings, and arts center, a theater building, administrative and dining facility, horse barn and riding hall, chicken coop, greenhouse, and extensive grounds. The curriculum was divided into periods of academic studies, practical skills development (cooking, forestry, gardening, animal care, etc.), chores, and recreation. Personal electronics were not allowed, although students used computers for some of their academic work. Face to face interaction, reading, and physical activity were encouraged instead.

Admissions 
Monarch School offered year-round enrollment, and cost of tuition was a "flat monthly tuition rate of $7000." Partial financial aid was granted in many cases.

See also 
 CEDU

References 

Schools in Sanders County, Montana
Private schools in Montana
Boarding schools in Montana
Educational institutions established in 2000
2000 establishments in Montana
Therapeutic boarding schools in the United States